Giovanni Battista Costa (4 March 1650 – 15 August 1714) was a Roman Catholic prelate who served as Bishop of Sagone (1688–1714).

Biography
Giovanni Battista Costa was born in Genoa, Italy on 4 March 1650 and ordained a priest on 25 February 1673. On 14 June 1688, he was appointed during the papacy of Pope Innocent XI as Bishop of Sagone. On 20 June 1688, he was consecrated bishop by Stefano Giuseppe Menatti, Titular Bishop of Cyrene, with Pier Antonio Capobianco, Bishop Emeritus of Lacedonia, and Costanzo Zani, Bishop of Imola, serving as co-consecrators. He served as Bishop of Sagone until his death on 15 August 1714.

References

External links and additional sources
 (for Chronology of Bishops) 
 (for Chronology of Bishops)  

17th-century Roman Catholic bishops in Spain
18th-century Roman Catholic bishops in Spain
Bishops appointed by Pope Innocent XI
1650 births
1714 deaths